David Baldwin may refer to:
David Baldwin ( 1830s–1870s), American inventor; owner of David Baldwin House, Midland Park, New Jersey
David Dwight Baldwin (1831–1912), Hawaiian businessman, educator, and biologist 
David Baldwin (bowls) (1921–2012), New Zealand bowls player
Dave Baldwin (baseball) (born 1938), American baseball player
Dave Baldwin (American football) (born 1955), American football coach
David Baldwin (historian) (1946–2016), British historian and writer
David A. Baldwin (born 1946), political scientist
David S. Baldwin, California Adjutant General
David Baldwin (executive), English football executive